Shortly before the War of 1812, congress passed Military Tract of 1812. This allowed for quarter-sections of land to be promised to those enlisting to fight against the British. This encouraged both enlistment and later settlement, although many soldiers sold or traded their plots. 

The Archives and Special Collections Unit at Western Illinois University Libraries has information on the history of the Illinois Military Tract.

See also 

 Central New York Military Tract
 Land grant

References

External links 

 An Act to provide for designating, surveying and granting the Military Bounty Lands, Act of the 12th United States Congress, Session I, Chapter 77, May 6, 1812
 An Act to authorize the survey of two million acres (8,000 km²) of the public lands, in lieu of that quantity heretofore authorized to be surveyed, in the territory of Michigan, as military bounty lands, Act of the 14th United States Congress, Session I, Chapter 164, April 19, 1816
 Description of the military land in Michigan, report by surveyor-general Edward Tiffin, November 30, 1815, in Michigan As a Province, Territory and State, the Twenty-Sixth Member of the Federal Union Vol. 2, by Henry M. Utley and Clarence M. Cutcheon. pg. 254-255.
 The History of McDonough County, Illinois compiled by R. Chenoweth and S.W. Semonis, sponsored by the McDonough Co. Genealogical Society, 1992, Curtis Media Corporation, Dallas, TX.
 http://www.historyillinois.org/Markers/old_markers/224.htm Illinois State Historical Society, IL Military Tract, Henry County
 http://users.arn.net/~billco/uslpr4.htm
 MAXWELL v. MOORE, 63 U.S. Supreme Court 185 (1859)
 Black Hawk War
 Quincy Herald-Whig
 Western Illinois University Archives and Special Collections

War of 1812
Veterans' settlement schemes